Loredana Dinu (born Iordăchioiu; born 2 April 1984) is a retired Romanian épée fencer, twice World champion and twice European champion with Romania.

Biography
Dinu began fencing at age 11 after coaches from different sports did a presentation at her school. Her first coaches were Dumitru Popescu and Radu Mitrăchioiu. She took part in her first national championship at age 15; she was defeated in the final by Ana Maria Brânză, with whom she would later fence for Romania.

Dinu's first major results were a silver medal in the 2001 Junior World Championships and a bronze in the 2004 Junior World Championships. 
She won a gold medal with Romania in the 2010 and 2011 World Fencing Championships with Simona Alexandru, Ana Maria Brânză and Anca Măroiu. She competed in the women's team épée at the 2012 Summer Olympics in London, but Romania were defeated in quarter-finals against South Korea and missed the podium. She decided to take a break after the Olympics.

In January 2015 Dinu announced she would come back to competition, this time as a member of CS Dinamo București. In May she won a bronze medal in the Romanian national championship and reached the quarter-finals at the Rio de Janeiro Grand Prix.

References

External links
EuroFencing Profile

1984 births
Living people
Olympic fencers of Romania
Fencers at the 2012 Summer Olympics
Fencers at the 2016 Summer Olympics
Sportspeople from Craiova
Romanian female épée fencers
Olympic gold medalists for Romania
Olympic medalists in fencing
Medalists at the 2016 Summer Olympics